Shesha Shrabana is a 1976 Odia language Indian movie. It is directed by Prashant Nanda. It stars Prashant Nanda, Mahasweta Roy, Banaja Mohanty and Hemant Das. It is based on a novel of Basant Mahapatra by the same name. In 1979, the film remade as Naiyya in Hindi language by the same director. This film achieved great success in terms of box office and acclaimed by reviewers.

Synopsis
Sania (Prashant Nanda) lives with his ailing mother and friend Makara in village. They are fishermen by profession. One day they find a girl named Manika (Mahasweta Roy) in the river and rescue her. Sania brings the girls to his home and they look after the girl. After Manika gets well, Sania & Makara decide to return Manika to her parents. When they reach Manika's village, Manika's parent refuse to accept her back as she cohabited with lower caste people for some days. As no other way out, Sania takes Manika to his home. Manika falls in love with Sania. But Sania's heart doesn't allow him to accept the Manka's offer as Manika belongs to a higher caste. Sania, in the meantime tries to find out suitable match for Manika and finds a doctor, who comes to the village for the treatment of plague disease as the village was  effected by plague. The doctor agrees to marry Manika and leaves the town to get his family's approval. But days pass away, the doctor doesn't return. All the villagers in the village complain against Sania and Manika living together. Manika could not bear the comments made by the villager and vanished. Sania could not control himself and turns insane.

Cast
 Prashant Nanda	... 	Sania
 Mahasweta Roy ... 	Manika 
 Hemanta Das  ... 	Makara
 Banaja Mohanty... 	Gauri
 Dukhiram Swain	... 	Nidhi Misra
 Narendra Behera	... 	Bhola
 Dhira Biswal	... 	Village Doctor
 Mohammad Mohsin	... 	Kashi

Soundtrack
Music of the film is composed by Prafulla Kar.

Box office
The film created a box office record and did run for several weeks in theaters.

Trivia
Actress Mahasweta Roy debuted in the film after played a small role in the film Sindura Bindu. The film was part of Indian Panorama in 9th International Film Festival of India 1977 held in New Delhi.

Awards
 24th National Film Awards
 Best Feature Film in Odia
 Orissa State Film Awards1976
 Best feature film
 Best director ...Prashant Nanda
 Best story ...Basant Mahapatra
 Best composer - Prafulla Kar

References

External links
 

1976 films
Odia films remade in other languages
1970s Odia-language films
Films directed by Prashanta Nanda